Pánuco is a locality in the Mexican state of Zacatecas. It serves as the municipal seat of the surrounding Pánuco Municipality.

History
Pánuco was founded on 1 November 1548 by Diego de Ibarra, Francisco de Ibarra, and Cristóbal de Oñate. It became the seat of the eponymous municipality upon its foundation in 1824.

Demographics
In the 2020 Mexican Census, Pánuco recorded a population of 1,177 inhabitants living in 434 households.

References

Populated places in Zacatecas
Populated places established in 1548